This is a list of songs recorded by singer and musician Petr Spálený.

List 
note. - song - duet - (composer / lyricist) - year - album

(h:/t:) - composer or lyricist has not been determined yet
 cover versions of songs by other singers
 (work in progress)

A 
 
 Alberta - (Bob Dylan / Petr Spálený) - 1970 - Petr v Lucerně (1972),  (1996)
 Album
 Apolena
 A Sleep - Walking Fool - (Jan Spálený / Zdeněk Rytíř, Joy Turner) - Sail With Me (1972)
  - (Petr Spálený / Josef Fousek) - 1986 -  (1990) - song was recorded live in Semafor in 1986 
  - (Petr Spálený / Josef Fousek) - Andělé (1993),  (1993)
  - (Zdeněk Rytíř / Michal Horáček) -  (1994)
  - (Zdeněk Rytíř / Michal Horáček) - 1984 -  (1984)

B 
 Baby
  - (Jan Spálený / Vladimír Poštulka) - 1971 -  (1971)
 Balalajka - (Pavel Krejča / Jiří Štaidl) - 1968 - Petr Spálený a Apollobeat (1969)
 
 Banana Daiquiri
 Bílá Lydie
  - (Petr Spálený / Michal Horáček) - 1987, 1994 -  (1994)
 Bird on the wire - (Leonard Cohen / Leonard Cohen) - 1994 -  (1994) - cover version of a song by Leonard Cohen
 Blaník
  - (Jan Spálený / Vladimír Poštulka) - 1970 -  (1971, 1996)
 Blubbering Baby (Plakalo bejby) - (Jan Spálený / Jiří Štaidl, Joy Turner) - Sail With Me (1972)
 Blues - (Petr Spálený / Petr Spálený) - 1990 -  (1990)
 Bluesovej waltz
 Boxer
 
 
  (Gathering Dust) - (Doyle Holly / Zdeněk Rytíř) - 1971 - Petr v Lucerně (1972) 
  (Tonight Will Be Fine) - (Leonard Cohen / Petr Fleischer) - 1971 - Petr v Lucerně (1972), Best of Petr Spálený (1993)
  - (Petr Spálený / Petr Spálený) - 1993 - Pomalu a potichu (1993)

C 
 
 
  (Conquistador) - (Gary Brooker / Jiří Štaidl) - 1968 - Petr Spálený a Apollobeat (1969), Motel Nonstop (1982)
  - (Zdeněk Rytíř / Zdeněk Rytíř) - 1984 -  (1984)

D 
 
 Dalailama (Dalajláma) - (Jan Spálený / Vladimír Poštulka, Joy Turner) - Sail With Me (1972)
 Dalajláma - (Jan Spálený / Vladimír Poštulka) - 1971 -  (1971)
 
  (Four Kinds of Lonely) - (Lee Hazlewood / Pavel Vrba) - 1970 -  (1971), Petr v Lucerně (1972), Best of Petr Spálený (1993)
  - (Jan Spálený / Vladimír Poštulka) - 1969 - Petr Spálený a Apollobeat (1969)
  - (Jan Spálený / Boris Janíček) - 1974 - Podoby (1975)
  - (Pavel Krejča / Robert Filip) - 1984 - Dům smíchu (1984)
  - (Jan Spálený / Boris Janíček) - 1974 - Podoby (1975)
 
  (Canta Libre) - (Neil Diamond / Pavel Vrba) - 1974 - Podoby (1975)
  - Petr Spálený a Zdeněk Rytíř - (Petr Spálený / Zdeněk Rytíř) - 1979 -  (1980), Andělé (1993)
 
 
 
  (Long Gone) - (Neil Diamond / Pavel Vrba) - 1973 - Podoby (1975)
  (Holly Holy) - (Neil Diamond / Pavel Vrba) - 1971 - Petr v Lucerně (1972), Best of Petr Spálený (1993)
  - (Jan Spálený / Petr Fleischer) - 1969 -  (1971, 1996)
  - (Petr Spálený / Zdeněk Rytíř) - 1979 -  (1980)
 Dona Maria - (Václav Zahradník / Pavel Vrba) - 1974 - Podoby (1975)
  - (Jan Spálený / Pavel Vrba) - 1970 -  (1996)

E 
 El Alamein

F 
 Fata morgana - (Petr Spálený / Petr Spálený) - 1987 - Pomalu a potichu (1993)
 Four Kinds Of Lonely (Dáma při těle) - (Lee Hazlewood / Pavel Vrba, Lee Hazlewood) - Sail With Me (1972)

G 
 Games People Play - (Joe South / Joe South) - Sail With Me (1972)
 Good Bye Mary Lou

H 
 Haló taxi
 Hotel Blues
 
  (The Gambler) - (Don Schlitz / Zdeněk Rytíř) - Andělé (1993)
  - (Pavel Krejča / Vladimír Poštulka) - 1968 - Petr Spálený a Apollobeat (1969)

CH 
  - (Pavel Krejča/ Michal Horáček) - 1985 -  (1994)
 
  - (Petr Spálený / Miroslav Černý) - 1979 -  (1980)

I 
 I Am Very Grateful - (Pavel Krejča / Pavel Vrba, Joy Turner) - Sail With Me (1972)
 If I Were A Carpenter - (Tim Hardin / Tim Hardin) - Sail With Me (1972)
 Irma Jackson

J 
  - (Petr Spálený / Petr Spálený) - 1984 -  (1984)
  - (Jan Spálený / Vladimír Poštulka) - 1971 -  (1971)
  - Petr Spálený a Zdeněk Rytíř - (Petr Spálený / Zdeněk Rytíř) - 1981 - Motel Nonstop (1982)
  - (Pavel Krejča / Petr Spálený) - 1984 -  (1984)
 
 
  - (Pavel Krejča / Vladimír Poštulka) - 1981 - Motel Nonstop (1982) 
  - (Petr Spálený / Petr Spálený) - 1984 -  (1984)
  - (Jan Spálený / Petr Fleischer)  - 1970 -  (1971, 1996)
  - (Pavel Krejča / Pavel Vrba) - 1971 -  (1971)
 
  (Tin Soldier Man) - (Ray Davies / Petr Spálený) - 1971 - Petr v Lucerně (1972)
  (I Believe In You) - (Roger Cook / Zdeněk Rytíř) - 1981 - Motel Nonstop (1982)
 Jackpot
  (Couldn't Do Nothing Right) - (Gary P Nunn / Jan Spálený) - 1994 - (1994)
 
 
  - (Petr Spálený / Zdeněk Rytíř) - 1979 - Dítě štěstěny (1980), Andělé (1993)
  - (Jan Spálený / Miroslav Černý) - Best of Petr Spálený (1993)
  (Longer Boats) - (Cat Stevens / Boris Janíček) - 1974 - Podoby (1975),  (1994)
 
 Josefína - (Jan Spálený / Boris Janíček) - 1973 - Podoby (1975), Best of Petr Spálený (1993)

K 
 
 
 
 
 
  - (Petr Spálený / Josef Fousek) - Pomalu a potichu (1993)
  - (Petr Spálený / Josef Fousek) - 1987 - Andělé (1993)
 
 
 
  (If I Were A Carpenter) - (Tim Hardin / Pavel Vrba) - 1969 - Dáma při těle (1971), Best of Petr Spálený (1993)
  (Tell Laura I Love Her) - (Roy Peterson / Jiří Štaidl) - 1967 - Petr Spálený and Apollobeat (1969)
  (If You See Her) - (Mickey Newbury / Zdeněk Rytíř) - 1979 - Dítě štěstěny (1980), Andělé (1993)
  - (Petr Spálený / Petr Spálený) - 1984 - Dům smíchu (1984)
 
 King Of The Road
  - (Jan Spálený / Rostislav Černý) - 1968 - Petr Spálený and Apollobeat (1969)
 
  - (Jan Spálený / Petr Fleischer) - 1970 -  (1971, 1996)
  - (Zdeněk Rytíř / Zdeněk Rytíř) - 1979 -  (1980)
 Kolombína - (Jan Spálený / Jana Žížalová) - 1968 - Petr Spálený and Apollobeat (1969)
  - (Petr Spálený / Petr Spálený) - 1984 -  (1984)
 Kopec - (Jan Spálený / Miroslav Černý) - 1970 - Dáma při těle (1971)
  - (Petr Spálený / Petr Spálený) - 1981 - Motel Nonstop (1982) 
  (Pour Man) - (Lee Hazlewood / Petr Spálený) - 1969 - Petr Spálený and Apollobeat (1969)

L 
 
 Lady - (Petr Spálený / Petr Spálený) - 1981 - Motel Nonstop (1982), Andělé (1993), Pomalu a potichu (1993)
 Lalalalalalalalalá (Such A Funny Nights) - (Richard George Adams / Evangelos Papathanassiou, Petr Spálený) - 1971 - Petr v Lucerně (1972) 
 Laredo (Streets Of Laredo) - (traditional / Michal Bukovič) - 1990 - Andělé (1993)
 Láska
 
 Lenka
  - (Jan Spálený / Petr Spálený) - 1970 -  (1971, 1996)
 Lída
  - (Martin Kratochvíl/ Petr Spálený) - 1987 -  (1994)

M 
 
  (Loop Di Love) - (traditional, adapted by Hans-Michael Sczypior / Petr Spálený) - Best of Petr Spálený (1993)
 Mafie
  (Child Song) - (Neil Diamond / Petr Spálený) - 1971 - Petr v Lucerně (1972), Best of Petr Spálený (1993)
 
 Mária
 Marilyn - (Petr Spálený / Josef Fousek) - 1990 - Pomalu a potichu (1993)
 
  - (Jan Spálený / Jana Žížalová) - 1968 -  (1996)
  - (Jan Spálený / Petr Spálený) - 1974 - Podoby (1975)
  - (Petr Spálený / Petr Spálený) - 1990 -  (1990), Andělé (1993)
  - (Zdeněk Rytíř / Zdeněk Rytíř) - 1984 -  (1984)
  - (Jan Spálený / Boris Janíček) - 1974 - Podoby (1975)
  (Break My Mind) - Petr Spálený a Miluše Voborníková - (John D. Loudermilk / Petr Rada) - Best of Petr Spálený (1993)
  - (Jan Spálený / Petr Fleischer) - 1970 -  (1971, 1996)
 Montgomery
  - (Petr Spálený / Josef Fousek) - 1990 -  (1990), Pomalu a potichu (1993)
 Motel Nonstop (Irma Jackson) - (Merle Haggard / Miroslav Černý) - 1981 - Motel Nonstop (1982), Andělé (1993)
 ´ - (Jan Spálený / Eduard Pergner) - 1971 - Petr v Lucerně (1972)
  - (Jan Spálený / Jana Žížalová) - 1969 - Petr Spálený a Apollobeat (1969),  (1996)
 
 
  - (Bohuslav Ondráček / Robert Filip) - 1984 -  (1984)

N 
 
 
 
 
  - (Petr Spálený / Miroslav Černý) - 1981 - Motel Nonstop (1982), Andělé (1993)
 
  - (Petr Spálený / Petr Spálený) - 1980 - Andělé (1993)
 
 
 
 
  (Satin Sheets) - (W. A. Ramsey / Miroslav Černý) - 1979 -  (1980)
  (Morning Dew) - (Bonnie Dobson / Pavel Vrba) - 1974 - Podoby (1975)
  - (Petr Spálený/ Michal Horáček) - 1987, 1994 -  (1994)
 
  - (Petr Spálený/ Michal Horáček) - 1987, 1994, 1998 -  (1994)

O 
  (I Walking In the Rain) - (Tim Hardin / Pavel Vrba) - 1968 - Podoby (1975)
 
  - (Petr Spálený / Zdeněk Rytíř) - 1979 - Dítě štěstěny (1980), Andělé (1993)
  - (Petr Spálený / Josef Fousek) - 1990 - Až mě andělé (1990), Andělé (1993),  (1993)
 
 
  - (Ivan Štědrý / Pavel Vrba) - 1974 - Podoby (1975)
  - (neznámy author / neznámy author) - 1994 - Jen mě vyzvi lásko na souboj (1994)

P 
  - (Pavel Krejča / Zdeněk Rytíř) - 1979 -  (1980)
 Peggy - (Pavel Krejča / Zdeněk Rytíř) - 1979 - Dítě štěstěny (1980), Andělé (1993)
 Pipe Smoke Is Magic - (Jan Spálený / Pavel Vrba, Joy Turner) - Sail With Me (1972)
  - (Pavel Krejča / Vladimír Poštulka) - 1971 -  (1971)
  - (Jan Spálený / Petr Spálený) - 1970 -  (1971, 1996)
  - (Pavel Krejča / Jiří Štaidl) - 1967 - Petr Spálený a Apollobeat (1969), Best of Petr Spálený (1993)
  (The Games People Play) - (Joe South / Vladimír Poštulka) - Best of Petr Spálený (1993) 
  - (Jan Spálený / Eduard Pergner) - 1974 - Podoby (1975)
  - (Petr Spálený / Josef Fousek) - 1987 - Andělé (1993),  (1993)
 
 Pop music
  - (Jan Spálený / Petr Fleischer) - 1969 -  (1971, 1996)
 
 
 
  - (Petr Spálený / Zdeněk Rytíř) - 1979 -  (1980), Andělé (1993)
  - (Pavel Krejča / Jana Žížalová) - 1968 - Petr Spálený a Apollobeat (1969)
 
 
  - (Petr Spálený / Miroslav Černý) - 1981 - Motel Nonstop (1982)

R 
  - (Jan Spálený / Zdeněk Rytíř) - 1974 - Podoby (1975)
  (Run Boy Run) - (Lee Hazlewood / Petr Spálený, Boris Janíček) - 1974 - Podoby (1975)

S 
 Sail With Me, Magdalena (Já chci plout s Magdalenou) - (Jan Spálený / Vladimír Poštulka, Joy Turner) - Sail With Me (1972)
  - (Jan Spálený / Vladimír Poštulka) - 1970 -  (1971)
 Sen o New Orleans
 
 
 
  (Der Tod und das Mädchen) - Petr Spálený a Miluše Voborníková - (Franz Schuber / Pavel Vrba) - 1976 -  (1994)
 So-Long, Good-Bye - (Jan Spálený / Vladimír Poštulka, Joy Turner) - Sail With Me (1972)
  - (Pavel Krejča / Petr Spálený) - 1979 -  (1980)
  - (Pavel Krejča / Miroslav Černý) - 1981 - Motel Nonstop (1982)
 
  - (Jan Spálený / Boris Janíček) - 1974 - Podoby (1975)
  (I'd Rather Be Dead) - (Harry Nilsson / Boris Janíček) - 1974 - Podoby (1975)
  - (Petr Fleischer / Petr Fleischer) - 1969 -  (1996)
  - (Petr Spálený / Petr Spálený) - 1987 - Andělé (1993),  (1993)
  (Sylvia's Mother) - (Shel Silverstein / Zdeněk Rytíř) - Best of Petr Spálený (1993)

Š 
 Šedesátý léta

T 
 
  (Wait Till Next Year) - (Randy Newman / Pavel Vrba) - 1974 - Podoby (1975),  (1994)
 
  - (Pavel Krejča / Petr Spálený) - 1981 - Motel Nonstop (1982)
  - (Jan Spálený / Vladimír Poštulka) - 1971 - Dáma při těle (1971), Best of Petr Spálený (1993)
 
 
 
 The Charms Of Joy - (Jan Spálený / Pavel Vrba, Joy Turner) - Sail With Me (1972)
 The Mountain (Kopec) - (Jan Spálený / Miroslav Černý, Joy Turner) - Sail With Me (1972)
 
  - (Petr Spálený / Petr Spálený) - 1984 -  (1984)
  (Ob-La-Di, Ob-La-Da) - (Paul McCartney / Pavel Vrba) - 1969 - Petr Spálený a Apollobeat (1969), Best of Petr Spálený (1993)
 
  (The Death of The Clown) - (Ray Davies / Petr Spálený) - 1970 -  (1971), Best of Petr Spálený (1993)

U 
  - (Jan Spálený / Boris Janíček) - 1974 - Podoby (1975)
  - (Petr Spálený / Josef Fousek) - 1990 -  (1990),  (1993)
 
 
 
  - (Jan Spálený / Pavel Vrba) - 1971 - Petr v Lucerně (1972), Best of Petr Spálený (1993)

V 
 
 
 
 
  (Don't Make Promises) - (Tim Hardin / Jan Spálený) - 1994 -  (1994)
 
 
  - (Jan Spálený / Pavel Vrba) - 1974 - Podoby (1975)
  - (Petr Spálený / Zdeněk Rytíř) - 1981 - Motel Nonstop (1982)

Z 
  - (Jan Spálený / Pavel Vrba)  - 1970 -  (1971, 1996)
  - (Jan Spálený / Miroslav Černý) - 1970 -  (1971), Best of Petr Spálený (1993)
 
  - (Jan Spálený / Boris Janíček) - 1974 - Podoby (1975)
  (The Beat Goes On) - Petr Spálený a Yvonne Přenosilová - (Sonny Bono / Jiří Štaidl) - Best of Petr Spálený (1993)
  (In the Pines) - Petr Spálený a Jan Spálený - (tradicional /Petr Spálený/Jan Spálený) - 1994 -  (1994)
  - (Jan Spálený / Boris Janíček) - 1974 - Podoby (1975)
  - (Zdeněk Rytíř / Michal Horáček) - 1984 -  (1984)
  - (Jan Spálený / Petr Fleischer) - 1970 -  (1971, 1996)

References

External links 
 petrspaleny.cz/diskografie
 zateckecountry.cz/diskografie

Spaleny